Ebertia is a genus of mites in the family Acaridae.

Species
 Ebertia australis (Oudemans, 1917)

References

Acaridae